Çaykənd (known as Qasımağalı until 2015) is a village in the municipality of Şəkərbəy in the Gadabay Rayon of Azerbaijan.

References

Populated places in Gadabay District